Eutelia is a genus of moths of the family Euteliidae erected by Jacob Hübner in 1823.

Description
Palpi upturned, reaching just above vertex of head. Thorax smoothly scaled. Abdomen typically stout with a pair of anal tufts and extremely slight dorsal tufts on medial segments. Forewing with nearly straight costa, rectangular apex, obliquely curved outer margin and near base lobed inner margin.

Species

References

 Hacker, H. & Fibiger, M. (2006). "Updated list of Micronoctuidae, Noctuidae (s.l.), and Hyblaeidae species of Yemen, collected during three expeditions in 1996, 1998 and 2000, with comments and descriptions of species." Esperiana Buchreihe zur Entomologie 12: 75-166.

Euteliinae

pt:Eutelia